Uncool is the fifth studio album by recording artist Ron "Bumblefoot" Thal released in February 2002.  This is his third release under the Bumblefoot name. Uncool was originally released in 2000 only in France. The 2002 release contains two cover songs not included on the French version - "What's New Pussycat?" by Burt Bacharach and "Can't Take My Eyes Off You" sung by Frankie Valli. Songs excluded from the American release but on the French release were eventually included on Thal's Forgotten Anthology CD released in 2003.

Track listing

Track listing (French release)

Personnel
Ron "Bumblefoot" Thal - Guitars, vocals
LaFrae Olivia Sci - drums on tracks 1, 2, 3, 4, 6, 7
Sanford Oxenbery - drums on tracks 9, 11
Joe Bergamini - drums on tracks 5, 8, 10
Joe Bedford - drums on "Can't Take My Eyes Off You"
Frank Rao - bass on tracks 2, 5, 10
Thorndike Applethorple - all other bass tracks
Neil Alexander - piano on tracks 2, 10
Ray Porrigsworth - piano on 11
Lea DeMartini - flute on "Delilah"
Cletus Xalapagous - flute on 7, 8, 11
NJ Brunswick Brass - horns on tracks 10, 12
Herbert Wellington - tuba on "What's New Pussycat?"
Filbert Murray, Zachary Torme - cellos on "TJonez"
Callista & Beatrice Beans - violins on "Ronald's Comin' Back Now"
Ndjiwanta - Nigerian hymn vocals on "TJonez"
The Wilson Bennett Vocestra - vocal harmonies on tracks 3, 4, 7, 8, 9, 10
John Pec, Ben Bartlett - backing vocals on "Can't Take My Eyes Off You"
Anomos - guest lyricist on "I Hate Me More Than I Love You"
David Horenstein - guest vocalist on "Can't Take My Eyes Off You"

References 

2000 albums
Ron "Bumblefoot" Thal albums